The  Tennessee Titans season was the franchise's 46th season in the National Football League, the 56th overall and the 19th in the state of Tennessee. Second-year head coach Ken Whisenhunt was fired on November 3 following a 1–6 start, and was replaced by tight ends coach Mike Mularkey on an interim basis.  Despite slightly improving from their 2–14 season from the previous year, finishing with a 3–13 record (tied with the Cleveland Browns), they were statistically the worst team in the NFL for the season, thus earning the right to the top pick in the 2016 NFL Draft, later trading it to the Los Angeles Rams.

Until 2022, this was the last time the Titans had a losing season.

Uniform change
The Titans switched their primary colored jerseys from light "Titans Blue" to navy blue, the latter of which was the team's primary home jersey color from 1999–2007.

2015 draft class

Notes
 The Titans acquired an additional sixth-round selection (No. 208 overall) in a trade that sent the team's seventh-round selection (No. 219 overall) and linebacker Akeem Ayers to the New England Patriots.
 The Titans traded their second-round selection (No. 33 overall) to the New York Giants for the Giants' No. 40, No. 108, and No. 245 overall draft picks.

Staff

Final roster

Team captains
Taylor Lewan (OT) 
Delanie Walker (TE)
Jurrell Casey (DE)
Brian Orakpo (LB)
Wesley Woodyard (LB)
Jason McCourty (CB)

Schedule

Preseason

Regular season

Note: Intra-division opponents are in bold text.

Game summaries

Week 1: at Tampa Bay Buccaneers
This was Jameis Winston's first game in the NFL. His first pass attempt was intercepted and returned all the way for a touchdown by Coty Sensabaugh. On the other hand, Marcus Mariota threw 4 touchdowns in his NFL debut. The Titans commanded this game from start to finish and never trailed. With the win, the Titans began their season 1-0.

Week 2: at Cleveland Browns
With the loss, the Titans fell to 1-1.

Week 3: vs. Indianapolis Colts
The Titans led 27-14 in the third quarter after trailing 14-0 in the first half. In the fourth quarter, it was all Colts as they outscored the Titans 21-6 in the fourth quarter. The Titans had a chance to tie the game and force overtime late in the fourth quarter, but the 2-point conversion failed, and the Titans lost their 8th straight game against the Colts. With the loss, the Titans fell to 1-2.

Week 5: vs. Buffalo Bills
With the loss, the Titans fell to 1-3.

Week 6: vs. Miami Dolphins
With the loss, the Titans fell to 1-4.

Week 7: vs. Atlanta Falcons
In the low-scoring loss, the Titans fell to 1-5.

Week 8: at Houston Texans
With the loss, Tennessee fell to 1-6. This was also Ken Whisenhunt's last game coaching the Titans, as he was fired a couple of days later.

Week 9: at New Orleans Saints
Both teams missed potential game-winning field goals towards the end of regulation. In overtime, Marcus Mariota led the Titans down the field and threw the game-winning touchdown to Anthony Fasano to end the game. With the win, the Titans improved to 2-6, earning their first win under Mike Mularkey.

Week 10: vs. Carolina Panthers
With the loss, the Titans fell to 2-7.

Week 11: at Jacksonville Jaguars

The Titans wore their Nike "color rush" uniforms for this game. With the loss, the Titans fell to 2-8.

Week 12: vs. Oakland Raiders
The Titans led 21-17 late in the fourth quarter. However, the Raiders were able to march down the field to win it after Derek Carr threw the go-ahead touchdown to Seth Roberts with 1:21 remaining. The Titans tried to go down the field to try and tie the game, but Mariota threw an interception to Nate Allen with 50 seconds left to seal the game for Oakland. With the loss, the Titans fell to 2-9.

Week 13: vs. Jacksonville Jaguars

The Titans entered this game needing a win to avoid being eliminated from playoff contention.  The Titans outlasted the Jaguars 42-39 to improve their record to 3-9, which also improved on their win total from the previous year. This was be their only inter-conference win of the season. It was also their only home win of the season.

Week 14: at New York Jets
With the loss, the Titans fell to 3-10.

Week 15: at New England Patriots
With the loss, the Titans fell to 3-11.

Week 16: vs. Houston Texans
With the loss, the Titans fell to 3-12 and finished 1-7 at home for the second straight season.

Week 17: at Indianapolis Colts

The loss ends the Titans season with a losing record of 3-13, tying the Cleveland Browns for the worst record this season, and statistically (based on percentages) gives them the right to the top pick in the 2016 NFL Draft. They also lost their 9th straight game against the Colts.

Standings

Division

Conference

References

External links
 

Tennessee
Tennessee Titans seasons
Tennessee Titans